Conflict (Swedish: Konflikt) is a 1937 Swedish drama film directed by Per-Axel Branner and starring Lars Hanson, Sigurd Wallén and Aino Taube. It was shot at the Råsunda Studios in Stockholm. The film's sets were designed by the art director Arne Åkermark.

Synopsis
Shipbuilder Edvard Banck is so busy working on a new design, that he neglects his wife Birgit. She is drawn to the recently arrived engineer Reidar and resolves to leave her husband.

Cast
 Lars Hanson as 	Edvard Banck
 Sigurd Wallén as 	Gustaf Larsson
 Aino Taube as 	Birgit Banck
 Balthazar Bergh as 	Reidar Hagen
 Anders Henrikson as Jerker
 Björn Berglund as 	Kalle Karlsson
 Rune Carlsten as Herbert Broon
 Sven Bergvall as President of the worker's union
 Gösta Cederlundas 	General manager Haard
 Lotten Olsson as 	Lovisa Larsson
 Astrid Bodin as 	Banck's cook
 Eivor Engelbrektsson as 	Maid Anna 
 Victor Thorén as 	Vicke
 Carl Deurell as 	Member of the board 
 Knut Lambert as Member of the board 
 Erik Rosén as 	Member of the board 
 Kolbjörn Knudsen as Shipyard worker
 Tore Lindwall as 	Shipyard worker with rope 
 Hjalmar Peters as 	Old Shipyard Worker
 Georg Skarstedt as 	Shipyard Worker 
 Tom Walter as 	Shipyard Worker
 Olav Riégo as 	Banck's assistant 
 Albert Ståhl as 	Foreman

References

Bibliography 
 Qvist, Per Olov & von Bagh, Peter. Guide to the Cinema of Sweden and Finland. Greenwood Publishing Group, 2000.
 Wredlund, Bertil & Lindfors, Rolf. Långfilm i Sverige: 1930-1939. Proprius, 1983.

External links 
 

1937 films
Swedish drama films
1937 drama films
1930s Swedish-language films
Films directed by Per-Axel Branner
1930s Swedish films